Hing Keng Shek is a village in Sai Kung District, Hong Kong.

Administration
Hing Keng Shek, including Sam Fai Tin, is a recognized village under the New Territories Small House Policy.

References

External links
 Hing Keng Shek (Sai Kung) for election of resident representative (2019 to 2022)

Villages in Sai Kung District, Hong Kong